Padma Ratna Tuladhar (1940–2018) was a Nepalese politician and human rights activist. A resident of Kathmandu, he played an instrumental role in bringing the Nepali Maoists to mainstream politics from armed struggle.

He was elected to the Rastriya Panchayat from Kathmandu in the 1986 election. Following the restoration of multi party democracy he was elected to the Pratinidhi Sabha from Kathmandu 4 in 1991. He served in the cabinet of Prime Minister Man Mohan Adhikari as Minister for Labour and Health.

Tuladhar died at Kathmandu on 4 November 2018 due to a brain hemorrhage. He is survived by his wife Nil Shova Tuladhar and four children.

See also
Tuladhar
Adhikari cabinet, 1994
Winners and runners-up in the legislative elections of Nepal 1994

References

Nepalese human rights activists
People from Kathmandu
Year of birth missing
2018 deaths
Communist Party of Nepal (Maoist Centre) politicians
Nepalese atheists
Nepal MPs 1991–1994
Nepal MPs 1994–1999
Members of the Rastriya Panchayat
People of the Nepalese Civil War